Pamuklu  is a village in Mut district of Mersin Province, Turkey. At  it is situated in the Toros Mountains. The population of the village was 131 as of 2012. Main economic activity is farming and animal husbandry.

References 

Villages in Mut District